The list of Brunei Navy ships includes all ships that used to belong to and commissioned into Royal Brunei Navy service.

Surface combatants

Patrol Vessels

Darussalam class offshore patrol vessel 

The Darussalam-class offshore patrol vessel is a class of four offshore patrol vessels constructed for the Royal Brunei Navy. They are the largest and most capable ships of the Royal Brunei Navy, and often participate in international naval exercises.
 (06) KDB Darussalam
 (07) KDB Darulehsan
 (08) KDB Darulaman
 (09) KDB Daruttaqwa

Ijtihad-class patrol boat 

The ''Ijtihad-class consists of four fast patrol boats build by Lürssen Werft, Germany and delivered to Brunei in 2009. They patrol the coast of Brunei and sometimes participate in joint naval exercises.
 (17) KDB Itjihad
 (18) KDB Berkat
 (19) KDB Syafaat
 (20) KDB Afiat

 Decommissioned patrol vessels 

 Fast attack craft 

 Waspada-class fast attack craft 

The Waspada class is a class of fast attack craft that was built for the Royal Brunei Navy by Vosper Thornycroft in the late 1970s. Three vessels were built, and one remain in service while two were donated to the Indonesian Navy as patrol crafts.
 (P04) KDB Seteria

 KDB Mustaed 

The ship KDB Mustaed'' (21) is the only one of its kind in the Royal Brunei Navy. The vessel is in active service.
 (21) KDB Mustaed

Decommissioned fast attack crafts

Amphibious Ships

Landing crafts

Damuan class 

 (L31) KDB Damuan (Decommissioned)
 (L32) KDB Puni

Serasa class 

 (L33) KDB Serasa
 (L34) KDB Teraban

Hovercraft 
In 1968, several hovercraft of type SR.N5 and SR.N6 were acquired and put into service.

Sauders Roe class (Decommissioned) 

 SR.N5
 SR.N6

Auxiliary Ships

Launch boat 
Used as tug and dive tender.
 Burong Nuri

Miscelaneos vessels 

 KDB Bakti
 KDB Norain

References 

Militaries of Southeast Asia
Military history of Southeast Asia